The idiom tongue-in-cheek refers to a humorous or sarcastic statement expressed in a serious manner.

History
The phrase originally expressed contempt, but by 1842 had acquired its modern meaning. Early users of the phrase include Sir Walter Scott in his 1828 The Fair Maid of Perth.

The physical act of putting one's tongue into one's cheek once signified contempt. For example, in Tobias Smollett's The Adventures of Roderick Random, which was published in 1748, the eponymous hero takes a coach to Bath and on the way apprehends a highwayman. This provokes an altercation with a less brave passenger:

The phrase appears in 1828 in The Fair Maid of Perth by Sir Walter Scott: 

It is not clear how Scott intended readers to understand the phrase. The more modern ironic sense appeared in the 1842 poem "The Ingoldsby Legends" by the English clergyman Richard Barham, in which a Frenchman inspects a watch and cries:

The ironic usage originates with the idea of suppressed mirth—biting one's tongue to prevent an outburst of laughter.

See also 
 Slang dictionary

References

External links
 

English-language idioms
Humour
Satire
Tongue